Flash Gordon & the Warriors of Mongo is a role-playing game published by Fantasy Games Unlimited in 1977.

Description
Flash Gordon & the Warriors of Mongo is a science-fantasy system based on the Flash Gordon comic series. The game uses a "schematic" rules system in which characters and play are defined in only the most general of terms. The game includes campaign setting material describing the realms of the planet Mongo.

Publication history
Flash Gordon & the Warriors of Mongo was designed by Lin Carter and Scott Bizar, with a cover by Gray Morrow and featuring illustrations by Alex Raymond, and was published by Fantasy Games Unlimited in 1977 as a 52-page book with a cardstock reference card.

Reception

References

External links 
 An RPG Ahead of Its Time -- Flash Gordon & the Warriors of Mongo
Flash Gordon and the Warriors of Mongo Capsule Review

Fantasy Games Unlimited games
Flash Gordon
Role-playing games based on comics
Role-playing games introduced in 1977
Science fantasy role-playing games